Hanna Demydova (born 8 April 1987) is a Ukrainian triple jumper. She competed in the triple jump event at the 2012 Summer Olympics.

She was born to Valentin Demydov and Iryna Demydova in Sumy. She attended university in Mykolaiv, before going on to do a masters in sport management at the University of Southern Mississippi in the United States. She also competed collegiately for the Southern Miss Golden Eagles and won the Conference USA indoor and outdoor titles, as well as having a fourth-place finish at the NCAA Indoor Championships and a third-place finish at the NCAA Outdoor Championships in 2011, as well as winning the Nationals (NCAA Women's Division I Outdoor Track and Field Championships) at the end of her collegiate career in 2012. She finished her time at the institution having broken the school, conference (Conference USA) and NCAA (Women's Division I) records for the triple jump both indoors and outdoors.

Competition record

References

External links

1987 births
Living people
Sportspeople from Sumy
Ukrainian female triple jumpers
Olympic athletes of Ukraine
Athletes (track and field) at the 2012 Summer Olympics
Southern Miss Golden Eagles and Lady Eagles athletes